Mount Breaker is a mountain with double summits, the eastern summit being, at , the highest on Horseshoe Island, off Graham Land. The name was given by the United Kingdom Antarctic Place-Names Committee in 1958 and is descriptive; the two summits are separated by a shallow col and, when seen from the west, resemble a breaking wave.

References
 

Mountains of Graham Land
Fallières Coast